The 14th Cortes Generales is the current meeting of the Cortes Generales, the national legislature of Spain, with the membership determined primarily by the results of the general election held on 10 November 2019. The cortes met for the first time on 3 December 2019. According to the Constitution of Spain the maximum legislative term of the cortes is 4 years from the preceding election.

Election
The 14th Spanish general election under the 1978 Constitution was held on 10 November 2019. It saw the Spanish Socialist Workers' Party (PSOE) remaining the largest party in the Senate, the upper house of the Cortes Generales, as well as the largest party in the Congress of Deputies, the lower house of the Cortes Generales, but falling short of a majority.

History
The new senate met for the first time on 3 December 2019 and after two rounds of voting Pilar Llop (PSOE) was  elected as President of the Senate of Spain.

The new congress also met for the first time on 3 December 2019 and after two rounds of voting Meritxell Batet (PSOE) was elected as President of the Congress of Deputies with the support of the Unidos Podemos–En Comú Podem (UP–ECP) and various nationalist and regionalist parties.

Members

Senate

Congress of Deputies

References

2019 establishments in Spain
Cortes Generales
Cortes Generales